Hobro railway station is a railway station serving the town of Hobro, Denmark.

The station is located on the Randers–Aalborg Line from Randers to Aalborg. The station opened in 1869. Hobro station offers direct InterCity services to Copenhagen and Aalborg. The train services are operated by DSB.

History 

The station opened in 1869 with the opening of the Randers-Aalborg railway line from Randers to Aalborg. In 1893, Hobro Station also became the southern terminus of the new Hobro–Aalestrup–Løgstør railway line, until the section between Hobro and Aalestrup was closed in 1966.

Architecture 
The original station building was designed by the Danish architect N.P.C. Holsøe. In 1893, the present station building opened. It was designed by the Danish architect Thomas Arboe. The station building was listed in 1992.

Operations 
The train services are operated by the railway company DSB. The station offers direct InterCity services to Copenhagen and Aalborg.

See also
 List of railway stations in Denmark

References

Bibliography

External links

 Banedanmark – government agency responsible for maintenance and traffic control of most of the Danish railway network
 DSB – largest Danish train operating company
 Danske Jernbaner – website with information on railway history in Denmark
 Nordjyllands Jernbaner – website with information on railway history in North Jutland

Railway stations in the North Jutland Region
Railway stations opened in 1869
Listed railway stations in Denmark
1869 establishments in Denmark
Buildings and structures in Mariagerfjord Municipality
Railway stations in Denmark opened in the 19th century